Shryock Auditorium is located on the campus of Southern Illinois University Carbondale in Carbondale, Illinois, United States. The auditorium was named for the university's fifth president, Henry William Shryock, who died inside the building just before a student convocation on April 13, 1935. The auditorium is a focal point for musical performances and distinguished lectures in the local area.

The auditorium was designed by State Architect James B. Dibelka of Chicago, and construction was awarded to Champaign-area general contractor A.W. Stoolman. Construction began in mid-1916, following the award of $135,000.00 for construction by the General Assembly in early 1915.

The auditorium's dome was originally stained glass. This was removed in the 1960s to allow for concerts and performances during the day and replaced with an elaborate system of latticework. The original stained glass is maintained by the Special Collections Research Center at Morris Library on campus.

The auditorium's last major upgrade was in 1969-1970. The project included installation of updated theater lighting, and remodeling of the lobby. During construction in 1970, the Reuter pipe organ was also installed on the upper balcony. Between 2002 and 2014, the stage of the auditorium was replaced and a new lighting and electrical control system was installed.

Shryock Organ

 
A prominent feature of the auditorium is a 3,312-pipe, 3-manual, 58-rank, Reuter Pipe Organ (Opus 1741) built in 1970. The organ was designed by and named for organ professor Marianne Webb, who died on December 7, 2013.

Notable speeches, performances, and events

References

External links 
 3-D Panoramic Interior Tour

Auditoriums in the United States
Concert halls in Illinois
Southern Illinois University Carbondale
Buildings and structures in Jackson County, Illinois
Event venues established in 1918

Music venues completed in 1918
1918 establishments in Illinois
Romanesque Revival architecture in Illinois